The 1907 Minnesota Golden Gophers football team represented the University of Minnesota in the 1907 college football season. In their eighth year under head coach Henry L. Williams, the Golden Gophers compiled a 2–2–1 record (0–1–1 against Western Conference opponents) and outscored all opponents 55 to 52.

Schedule

References

Minnesota
Minnesota Golden Gophers football seasons
Minnesota Golden Gophers football